Lisa Ann Cutter (born October 14, 1963) is an American politician and a member of the Colorado Senate who represents District 20. The 20th senate district includes all or part of the communities of Lakewood, Dakota Ridge, Arvada, Fairmount and Evergreen in Jefferson County.

Previously, she served in the Colorado House of Representatives from the 25th district in Jefferson County. In 2022, Cutter was elected to the State Senate.

Political career

Election
Cutter was elected in the general election on November 6, 2018, winning 53 percent of the vote over 47 percent of Republican candidate Steve Szutenbach.

In the 2022 Colorado State Senate election, Cutter defeated Republican candidate Tim Walsh with 54 percent of the vote.

References

Democratic Party Colorado state senators
Cutter, Lisa
Living people
21st-century American politicians
21st-century American women politicians
Women state legislators in Colorado
1963 births